The Union for Future Benin was an electoral alliance in Benin. In the legislative elections held on 30 March 2003, the party was member of the Presidential Movement, the alliance of supporters of Mathieu Kérékou, who had won the 2001 presidential elections, and won 31 out of 83 seats. The most important of the member parties were the Action Front for Renewal and Development and the Social Democratic Party.

Political party alliances in Benin